St Lawrence's Church, Walton-on-Trent is a  Grade II* listed parish church in the Church of England in Walton-on-Trent, Derbyshire.

History

The church dates from the 12th century with elements from the 13th and 15th centuries. It was restored in 1868 by George Edmund Street.

Organ
 
The pipe organ was installed by Bevington and Sons in 1868. A specification of the organ can be found on the National Pipe Organ Register.

Parish status

The church is in a joint parish with
St Mary's Church, Coton in the Elms
St John the Baptist's Church, Croxall cum Oakley
St Nicholas and the Blessed Virgin Mary's Church, Croxall cum Oakley
All Saints' Church, Lullington
St Mary's Church, Rosliston
St Peter's Church, Netherseal
St Matthew's Church, Overseal

See also
Grade II* listed buildings in South Derbyshire
Listed buildings in Walton-on-Trent

References

Church of England church buildings in Derbyshire
Grade II* listed churches in Derbyshire